Vladslo German war cemetery is about three kilometres north east of Vladslo, near Diksmuide, Belgium. Established during World War I, the cemetery holds 3,233 wartime burials. In 1956, burials from many smaller surrounding cemeteries were concentrated in Vladslo, and it now contains the remains of 25,644 soldiers. Each stone bears the name of twenty soldiers, with just their name, rank, and date of death specified.

The cemetery is administered by the German War Graves Commission (Volksbund Deutsche Kriegsgräberfürsorge). They also look after the three other German war cemeteries in Belgium: Langemark, Menen and Hooglede.

The Grieving Parents

The cemetery also contains a pair of statues – The Grieving Parents – by Käthe Kollwitz, a noted German sculptor. She made the statues in the 1930s as a tribute to her youngest son, Peter, who was killed in October 1914 and is buried in the cemetery. The eyes on the father-figure gaze on the stone directly in front of him, on which Kollwitz's son's name is engraved.

References/notes

External links 
 
 Ieper (Ypres) – Belgium. Nearby site: Deutscher Soldatenfriedhof 1914–1918 (German military cemetery), Vladslo.
 German military cemetery Vladslo.
 Ypres: Vladslo German Cemetery.
 (de) Vladslo, on website of Volksbund.
 (nl) Duitse militaire begraafplaats Vladslo (German military cemetery Vladslo), on WO1.be

Diksmuide
German War Graves Commission
World War I memorials in Belgium
World War I cemeteries in Belgium
Cemeteries and memorials in West Flanders